The DPW Worlds Championship is a professional wrestling world heavyweight championship owned and promoted by Deadlock Pro-Wrestling (DPW). The current champion is Lucky Ali, who is in his first reign.

History 
On December 11, 2021,  Deadlock Pro-Wrestling (DPW) filmed their first DPW Fire episode, when a tournament for the title has started. On January 8, 2022, Bojack defeated Andrew Everett in the tournament finals to become the inaugural world champion.

Worlds Championship Eliminator Tournament (2021)

Reigns 
Bojack was the inaugural champion. Lucky Ali is the current champion in his first reign. He defeated the previous champion Bojack and Kidd Bandit in a three-way match at World's Strongest in Concord, NC.

References 

World professional wrestling championships